Michael Hackert (born June 21, 1981) is a professional German ice hockey centre who last played for Heilbronner Falken of the DEL2. Hackert also played for Iserlohn Roosters of the German Deutsche Eishockey Liga (DEL), as well as for the Grand Rapids Griffins of the American Hockey League. In addition, Hackert has been a member of the German national team in several international competitions.

Career statistics

Regular season and playoffs

International

External links
 
 

1981 births
Living people
Sportspeople from Heilbronn
Adler Mannheim players
DEG Metro Stars players
Füchse Duisburg players
Frankfurt Lions players
German ice hockey centres
Grand Rapids Griffins players
Heilbronner EC players
Iserlohn Roosters players